RML 11-inch 25-ton guns were large rifled muzzle-loading guns used as primary armament on British battleships and for coastal defence. They were effectively the same gun as the RML 12-inch 25-ton gun, bored to 11 inches instead of 12.

Design 

Mark I was introduced in 1867. Mark II was introduced in 1871 using the simpler and cheaper "Fraser" gun construction method which had proved successful with the RML 9-inch 12-ton Mk IV gun.

In 1874 the process of development made a "New Eighty-one Ton Gun" available in Woolwich.

Naval service 
Guns were mounted on:
 HMS Alexandra, commissioned 1877.
 HMS Temeraire, commissioned 1877.

Ammunition 
When the gun was first introduced projectiles had several rows of "studs" which engaged with the gun's rifling to impart spin. Sometime after 1878, "attached gas-checks" were fitted to the bases of the studded shells, reducing wear on the guns and improving their range and accuracy. Subsequently, "automatic gas-checks" were developed which could rotate shells, allowing the deployment of a new range of studless ammunition. Thus, any particular gun potentially operated with a mix of studded and studless ammunition.

The gun's primary projectile was 536 – 543 pound "Palliser" armour-piercing shot, which were fired with a "Battering charge" of 85 pounds of "P" (gunpowder) or 70 pounds of "R.L.G." (gunpowder) for maximum velocity and hence penetrating power. Shrapnel and Common (exploding) shells weighed 532 – 536 pounds and were fired with a "Full charge" of 60 pounds "P" or 50 pounds "R.L.G.".

See also 
 List of naval guns

Surviving examples 

 Two Mark II guns, number 12 and 14 at Fort George, Bermuda : 
 Mark II gun number 30 at Fort Nelson, Portsmouth, UK
 Three Mark II guns on Drake's Island, Plymouth, UK
 Four guns outside Fort Saint Elmo, Malta
 Mark II gun dated 1871 outside Fort St. Catherine, Bermuda

Notes

References 
 Treatise on Ammunition. War Office, UK, 1877
 Treatise on the Construction and Manufacture of Ordnance in the British service. War Office, UK, 1877
 Treatise on the Construction and Manufacture of Ordnance in the British Service. War Office, UK, 1879
 Text Book of Gunnery, 1887. LONDON : PRINTED FOR HIS MAJESTY'S STATIONERY OFFICE, BY HARRISON AND SONS, ST. MARTIN'S LANE

External links 

 11inch or 12inch R.M.L. of 25tons on 'C' Pivot Mark I

Naval guns of the United Kingdom
280 mm artillery
Victorian-era weapons of the United Kingdom
Coastal artillery
Disappearing guns